Mary Taylor (born 1948) is a New Zealand artist and children's author.

Background 
Mary Taylor was born in Devonport, Auckland in 1948. She was educated at the University of Auckland and Massey University.

Career 
Formerly a teacher, Taylor has worked as a professional artist since 1983. Taylor is known for etchings and paintings. She follows a traditional process in her etchings, involving nitric acid, zinc plate, a manual etching press, and hand colouring each work. Her paintings primarily use acrylic and oils. Taylors works are grounded in realism and predominantly of New Zealand's flora and fauna.

Taylor has exhibited with the New Zealand Academy of Fine Arts and internationally, in New York and Beijing, as part of exhibitions of New Zealand art.

She is the author of Old Blue: The Rarest Bird in the World, winner of the AIM Children's Book Awards non-fiction award in 1994.

References

Further reading 
Artist files held for Mary Taylor are held at:
 Angela Morton Collection, Takapuna Library
 E. H. McCormick Research Library, Auckland Art Gallery Toi o Tāmaki
 Hocken Collections Uare Taoka o Hākena
 Te Aka Matua Research Library, Museum of New Zealand Te Papa Tongarewa

Living people
1948 births
New Zealand painters
New Zealand women painters
New Zealand women children's writers
New Zealand children's writers
20th-century New Zealand writers
Massey University alumni
University of Auckland alumni
People from Auckland